Barnabas Rugwizangonga Halem ’Imana (1929–3 January 2016),  was a Ugandan Roman Catholic priest who served as Bishop of the Roman Catholic Diocese of Kabale from 1969 until 1994.

Background and priesthood
Halem ’Imana was born in Rulangara, in present-day Kisoro District, in the Western Region of Uganda, in 1929. He was ordained a priest on 7 December 1958 at  Mbarara. He served as a priest at Mbarara until 1 February 1966, when he was transferred to Kabale. He served as a priest at Kabale until 29 May 1969, when he was appointed bishop.

As bishop
He was appointed Bishop of Kabale on 29 May 1969. He was ordained bishop 1 August 1969 by Pope Paul VI, assisted by Archbishop Sergio Pignedoli†, Titular Archbishop of Iconium and Archbishop Emmanuel Kiwanuka Nsubuga†, Archbishop of Kampala.

He resigned as bishop on 15 July 1994. He died on 3 January 2016 at age 87 years.

See also
 Uganda Martyrs
 Roman Catholicism in Uganda

Succession table

References

External links
 Roman Catholic Diocese of Kabale

1929 births
2016 deaths
20th-century Roman Catholic bishops in Uganda
21st-century Roman Catholic bishops in Uganda
People from Kisoro District
Roman Catholic bishops of Kabale